The Beagle-Harrier is a scenthound. It is a breed of dog originating from France.

Characteristics

Appearance

The Beagle-Harrier appears to be either a large Beagle or a small Harrier. Its coat is usually tricolor, featuring the colors fawn, black, tan, or white. There are also grey-coated (tricolor) Beagle-Harriers. The Beagle-Harrier's body is usually muscular and its coat smooth and thick.

Temperament
The Beagle-Harrier is generally good with children and other pets. They are loyal and determined, making them a good family pet. They are a hunting breed and so require a lot of exercise and space.

Health
The Beagle Harrier is generally healthy and has a life span of 12 to 13 years. Hip dysplasia could cause a big problem.

History
Beagle-Harriers were bred in France in the 19th century by Baron Gerard. The Beagle Harrier could be a mixture of two breeds, the Beagle and the Harrier, or the midpoint in breeding between the two breeds. The Beagle-Harrier was later imported into America in the mid-1800s to hunt rabbits. It was recognized by the FCI in 1974. The Beagle-Harrier can now be quite rarely found in France and is even more rare in other countries.

See also
 Dogs portal
 List of dog breeds
 Beagle
 Harrier

References

External links

Club du Beagle, de Beagle Harrier et du Harrier (In French)

FCI breeds
Scent hounds
Dog breeds originating in France